This article contains a discussion of paradoxes of set theory. As with most mathematical paradoxes, they generally reveal surprising and counter-intuitive mathematical results, rather than actual logical contradictions within modern axiomatic set theory.

Basics

Cardinal numbers 
Set theory as conceived by Georg Cantor assumes the existence of infinite sets. As this assumption cannot be proved from first principles it has been introduced into axiomatic set theory by the axiom of infinity, which asserts the existence of the set N of natural numbers. Every infinite set which can be enumerated by natural numbers is the same size (cardinality) as N, and is said to be countable. Examples of countably infinite sets are the natural numbers, the even numbers, the prime numbers, and also all the rational numbers, i.e., the fractions. These sets have in common the cardinal number |N| =  (aleph-nought), a number greater than every natural number.

Cardinal numbers can be defined as follows. Define two sets to have the same size by: there exists a bijection between the two sets (a one-to-one correspondence between the elements). Then a cardinal number is, by definition, a class consisting of all sets of the same size. To have the same size is an equivalence relation, and the cardinal numbers are the equivalence classes.

Ordinal numbers 
Besides the cardinality, which describes the size of a set, ordered sets also form a subject of set theory. The axiom of choice guarantees that every set can be well-ordered, which means that a total order can be imposed on its elements such that every nonempty subset has a first element with respect to that order. The order of a well-ordered set is described by an ordinal number. For instance, 3 is the ordinal number of the set {0, 1, 2} with the usual order 0 < 1 < 2; and ω is the ordinal number of the set of all natural numbers ordered the usual way. Neglecting the order, we are left with the cardinal number |N| = |ω| = .

Ordinal numbers can be defined with the same method used for cardinal numbers. Define two well-ordered sets to have the same order type by: there exists a bijection between the two sets respecting the order: smaller elements are mapped to smaller elements. Then an ordinal number is, by definition, a class consisting of all well-ordered sets of the same order type. To have the same order type is an equivalence relation on the class of well-ordered sets, and the ordinal numbers are the equivalence classes.

Two sets of the same order type have the same cardinality. The converse is not true in general for infinite sets: it is possible to impose different well-orderings on the set of natural numbers that give rise to different ordinal numbers.

There is a natural ordering on the ordinals, which is itself a well-ordering. Given any ordinal α, one can consider the set of all ordinals less than α. This set turns out to have ordinal number α. This observation is used for a different way of introducing the ordinals, in which an ordinal is equated with the set of all smaller ordinals. This form of ordinal number is thus a canonical representative of the earlier form of equivalence class.

Power sets 
By forming all subsets of a set S (all possible choices of its elements), we obtain the power set P(S). Georg Cantor proved that the power set is always larger than the set, i.e., |P(S)| > |S|. A special case of Cantor's theorem proves that the set of all real numbers R cannot be enumerated by natural numbers. R is uncountable: |R| > |N|.

Paradoxes of the infinite sets 

Instead of relying on ambiguous descriptions such as "that which cannot be enlarged" or "increasing without bound", set theory provides definitions for the term infinite set to give an unambiguous meaning to phrases such as "the set of all natural numbers is infinite". Just as for finite sets, the theory makes further definitions which allow us to consistently compare two infinite sets as regards whether one set is "larger than", "smaller than", or "the same size as" the other. But not every intuition regarding the size of finite sets applies to the size of infinite sets, leading to various apparently paradoxical results regarding enumeration, size, measure and order.

Paradoxes of enumeration 
Before set theory was introduced, the notion of the size of a set had been problematic. It had been discussed by Galileo Galilei and Bernard Bolzano, among others. Are there as many natural numbers as squares of natural numbers when measured by the method of enumeration?
 The answer is yes, because for every natural number n there is a square number n2, and likewise the other way around.
 The answer is no, because the squares are a proper subset of the naturals: every square is a natural number but there are natural numbers, like 2, which are not squares of natural numbers.

By defining the notion of the size of a set in terms of its cardinality, the issue can be settled. Since there is a bijection between the two sets involved, this follows in fact directly from the definition of the cardinality of a set.

See Hilbert's paradox of the Grand Hotel for more on paradoxes of enumeration.

Je le vois, mais je ne crois pas 
"I see it but I don't believe," Cantor wrote to Richard Dedekind after proving that the set of points of a square has the same cardinality as that of the points on just an edge of the square: the cardinality of the continuum.

This demonstrates that the "size" of sets as defined by cardinality alone is not the only useful way of comparing sets. Measure theory provides a more nuanced theory of size that conforms to our intuition that length and area are incompatible measures of size.

The evidence strongly suggests that Cantor was quite confident in the result itself and that his comment to Dedekind refers instead to his then-still-lingering concerns about the validity of his proof of it. Nevertheless, Cantor's remark would also serve nicely to express the surprise that so many mathematicians after him have experienced on first encountering a result that is so counter-intuitive.

Paradoxes of well-ordering 
In 1904 Ernst Zermelo proved by means of the axiom of choice (which was introduced for this reason) that every set can be well-ordered. In 1963 Paul J. Cohen showed that in Zermelo–Fraenkel set theory without the axiom of choice  it is not possible to prove the existence of a well-ordering of the real numbers.

However, the ability to well order any set allows certain constructions to be performed that have been called paradoxical. One example is the Banach–Tarski paradox, a theorem widely considered to be nonintuitive.  It states that it is possible to decompose a ball of a fixed radius into a finite number of pieces and then move and reassemble those pieces by ordinary translations and rotations (with no scaling) to obtain two copies from the one original copy. The construction of these pieces requires the axiom of choice; the pieces are not simple regions of the ball, but complicated subsets.

Paradoxes of the Supertask 

In set theory, an infinite set is not considered to be created by some mathematical process such as "adding one element" that is then carried out "an infinite number of times". Instead, a particular infinite set (such as the set of all natural numbers) is said to already exist, "by fiat", as an assumption or an axiom. Given this infinite set, other infinite sets are then proven to exist as well, as a logical consequence. But it is still a natural philosophical question to contemplate some physical action that actually completes after an infinite number of discrete steps; and the interpretation of this question using set theory gives rise to the paradoxes of the supertask.

The diary of Tristram Shandy 
Tristram Shandy, the hero of a novel by  Laurence Sterne, writes his autobiography so conscientiously that it takes him one year to lay down the events of one day. If he is mortal he can never terminate; but if he lived forever then no part of his diary would remain unwritten, for to each day of his life a year devoted to that day's description would correspond.

The Ross-Littlewood paradox 

An increased version of this type of paradox shifts the infinitely remote finish to a finite time. Fill a huge reservoir with balls enumerated by numbers 1 to 10 and take off ball number 1. Then add the balls enumerated by numbers 11 to 20 and take off number 2. Continue to add balls enumerated by numbers 10n - 9 to 10n and to remove ball number n for all natural numbers n = 3, 4, 5, .... Let the first transaction last half an hour, let the second transaction last quarter an hour, and so on, so that all transactions are finished after one hour. Obviously the set of balls in the reservoir increases without bound. Nevertheless, after one hour the reservoir is empty because for every ball the time of removal is known.

The paradox is further increased by the significance of the removal sequence. If the balls are not removed in the sequence 1, 2, 3, ... but in the sequence 1, 11, 21, ... after one hour infinitely many balls populate the reservoir, although the same amount of material as before has been moved.

Paradoxes of proof and definability 

For all its usefulness in resolving questions regarding infinite sets, naive set theory has some fatal flaws. In particular, it is prey to logical paradoxes such as those exposed by Russell's paradox. The discovery of these paradoxes revealed that not all sets which can be described in the language of naive set theory can actually be said to exist without creating a contradiction. The 20th century saw a resolution to these paradoxes in the development of the various axiomatizations of set theories such as ZFC and NBG in common use today. However, the gap between the very formalized and symbolic language of these theories and our typical informal use of mathematical language results in various paradoxical situations, as well as the philosophical question of exactly what it is that such formal systems actually propose to be talking about.

Early paradoxes: the set of all sets 

In 1897 the Italian mathematician Cesare Burali-Forti discovered that there is no set containing all ordinal numbers. As every ordinal number is defined by a set of smaller ordinal numbers, the well-ordered set Ω of all ordinal numbers (if it exists) fits the definition and is itself an ordinal. On the other hand, no ordinal number can contain itself, so Ω cannot be an ordinal. Therefore, the set of all ordinal numbers cannot exist.

By the end of the 19th century Cantor was aware of the non-existence of the set of all cardinal numbers and the set of all ordinal numbers. In letters to David Hilbert and Richard Dedekind he wrote about inconsistent sets, the elements of which cannot be thought of as being all together, and he used this result to prove that every consistent set has a cardinal number.

After all this, the version of the "set of all sets" paradox conceived by Bertrand Russell in 1903 led to a serious crisis in set theory. Russell recognized that the statement x = x is true for every set, and thus the set of all sets is defined by  {x | x = x}. In 1906 he constructed several paradox sets, the most famous of which is the set of all sets which do not contain themselves. Russell himself explained this abstract idea by means of some very concrete pictures. One example, known as the Barber paradox, states: The male barber who shaves all and only men who do not shave themselves has to shave himself only if he does not shave himself.

There are close similarities between Russell's paradox in set theory and the Grelling–Nelson paradox, which demonstrates a paradox in natural language.

Paradoxes by change of language

König's paradox 
In 1905, the Hungarian mathematician Julius König published a paradox based on the fact that there are only countably many finite definitions. If we imagine the real numbers as a well-ordered set, those real numbers which can be finitely defined form a subset.  Hence in this well-order there should be a first real number that is not finitely definable. This is paradoxical, because this real number has just been finitely defined by the last sentence. This leads to a contradiction in naive set theory.

This paradox is avoided in axiomatic set theory. This result is known as Tarski's indefinability theorem; it applies to a wide class of formal systems including all commonly studied axiomatizations of set theory.

Richard's paradox 

In the same year the French mathematician Jules Richard used a variant of Cantor's diagonal method to obtain another contradiction in naive set theory. Consider the set A of all finite agglomerations of words. The set E of all finite definitions of real numbers is a subset of A. As A is countable, so is E. Let p be the nth decimal of the nth real number defined by the set E; we form a number N having zero for the integral part and p + 1 for the nth decimal if p is not equal either to 8 or 9, and unity if p is equal to 8 or 9. This number N is not defined by the set E because it differs from any finitely defined real number, namely from the nth number by the nth digit. But N has been defined by a finite number of words in this paragraph. It should therefore be in the set E. That is a contradiction.

As with König's paradox, this paradox cannot be formalized in axiomatic set theory because it requires the ability to tell whether a description applies to a particular set (or, equivalently, to tell whether a formula is actually the definition of a single set).

Paradox of Löwenheim and Skolem 

Based upon work of the German mathematician Leopold Löwenheim (1915) the Norwegian logician  Thoralf Skolem showed in 1922 that every consistent theory of first-order predicate calculus, such as set theory, has an at most countable model. However, Cantor's theorem proves that there are uncountable sets. The root of this seeming paradox is that the countability or noncountability of a set is not always absolute, but can depend on the model in which the cardinality is measured. It is possible for a set to be uncountable in one model of set theory but countable in a larger model (because the bijections that establish countability are in the larger model but not the smaller one).

See also 
Proof of impossibility
Berry paradox

Notes

References 
G. Cantor: Gesammelte Abhandlungen mathematischen und philosophischen Inhalts, E. Zermelo (Ed.), Olms, Hildesheim 1966.
H. Meschkowski, W. Nilson: Georg Cantor - Briefe, Springer, Berlin 1991.
A. Fraenkel: Einleitung in die Mengenlehre, Springer, Berlin 1923.
A. A. Fraenkel, A. Levy: Abstract Set Theory, North Holland, Amsterdam 1976.
F. Hausdorff: Grundzüge der Mengenlehre, Chelsea, New York 1965.
B. Russell: The principles of mathematics I, Cambridge 1903.
B. Russell: On some difficulties in the theory of transfinite numbers and order types, Proc. London Math. Soc. (2) 4 (1907) 29-53.
P. J. Cohen: Set Theory and the Continuum Hypothesis, Benjamin, New York 1966.
S. Wagon: The Banach–Tarski Paradox, Cambridge University Press, Cambridge 1985.
A. N. Whitehead, B. Russell: Principia Mathematica I, Cambridge Univ. Press, Cambridge 1910, p. 64.
E. Zermelo: Neuer Beweis für die Möglichkeit einer Wohlordnung, Math. Ann. 65 (1908) p. 107-128.

External links
Principia Mathematica
Definability paradoxes by Timothy Gowers

Set theory
 
Set theory